was a warlord of the Sengoku and early Edo periods and progenitor of the Nabeshima lords of the Saga Domain. 
He was a vassal of the Ryūzōji clan during the Sengoku period of the 16th century.

Biography

Naoshige proved himself in battle as he led forces of Ryūzōji Takanobu. 

In 1570, Naoshige assisted Takanobu while at Saga Castle when it was surrounded by a 60,000-man Ōtomo clan army. However, Naoshige had only 5,000 troops, so he suggested a night raid on the enemies camp which successfully routed them. 

In 1575, he attacked Suko Castle in western Hizen and forced its commander, Hirai Tsuneharu, to commit suicide.

In 1584, Naoshige also assisted Takanobu during the Battle of Okitanawate but was unable to prevent their rout which later ended in Takanobu's death. 
Naoshige was the chief retainer for the daimyo of Hizen when Takanobu died, which also included the Saga Castle 

In 1587, Naoshige took this chance of having a weak heir to leave the Ryūzōji and to support Toyotomi Hideyoshi while during his battle against Kyūshū. 
Nabeshima distinguished himself in battle by killing hundreds of men. 

In 1592, he was sent on Hideyoshi's Korean campaigns where he struck up a friendship with Katō Kiyomasa and upon his return to Hizen, with Tokugawa Ieyasu.
Naoshige followed in leading over 12,000 men to Korea in the First Korean Campaign.

In 1600, Naoshige fought at Siege of Udo and Siege of Yanagawa in Tokugawa side. At the Battle of Sekigahara, Naoshige sent his son, Nabeshima Katsushige to assist Tokugawa Ieyasu. Following the victory of the Tokugawa clan, their 357,000-koku fief went untouched by Ieyasu. 

Afterwards, control of the domain passed to Naoshige, much of the Ryūzōji clan territory, when Ryūzōji Masaie was killed in battle in 1607.

Following Naoshige's death his family became very well known. 
Nabeshima's actions and sayings are immortalized in the third chapter of the Hagakure by writer Tsunetomo Yamamoto, a close attendant of Nabeshima Naoshige's grandson, Mitsushige.

Legacy
Naoshige is known for re-settling potters from Korea in Hizen.

See also
 Miyohime
 Nabeshima ware

References

Samurai
1538 births
1618 deaths
Ryūzōji clan
Daimyo
People of the Japanese invasions of Korea (1592–1598)
Nabeshima clan
Deified Japanese people
17th-century military history of Japan